Zapoqui is a small town in the state of Zacatecas, Mexico.

Populated places in Zacatecas